Christian Wesley Caldwell was an American politician who served as an elected member of the South Carolina House of Representatives during the Reconstruction era. He represented Orangeburg County.

References

People from Orangeburg County, South Carolina
Members of the South Carolina House of Representatives
Year of birth missing
Place of birth missing
Year of death missing
Place of death missing